Matthew Hill (born January 19, 1968) is a Canadian voice actor working for Ocean Productions.

Career
His roles include Ed in Ed, Edd n Eddy, Kevin Keene/Captain N in Captain N: The Game Master, Kira Yamato in Gundam Seed and Gundam Seed Destiny, Raphael in Ninja Turtles: The Next Mutation, Ryo Sanada in Ronin Warriors, Carlos in Transformers: Armada, Ironhide in Transformers: Energon, and Artha Penn and Dragon Booster in Dragon Booster. He is also the voice of the Wonderbolt Soarin' in My Little Pony: Friendship Is Magic.

He and Samuel Vincent are often cast together as friends, most famously in the Cartoon Network programme Ed, Edd n Eddy, with Ed (Hill) & Edd (Vincent) and as the two protagonists of the Mobile Suit Gundam SEED franchise; Kira Yamato (Hill) and Athrun Zala (Vincent).

He has one of the most youthful and recognized voices in the voice acting community, often cast in teenage roles because of this. His live-action role was his portrayal of Raphael in Teenage Mutant Ninja Turtles III and Ninja Turtles: The Next Mutation. He also played the deputy in the live-action movie Shanghai Knights, as well as a dramatized version of Jack Phillips in Titanic.

Besides voice acting, he is also an active athlete and avid marathon runner. He finished a year-long run around North America in 2008-2009, called the Run for One Planet. For the run, he and his partner ran a marathon nearly every day for one year in various cities across the United States and Canada and also gave school presentations and speaking events for environmental awareness.

Filmography

Voice roles

Anime (dubbing performances) 
Battle B-Daman – Announcer Guy
Beyblade Burst — Rantaro Kiyama (Seasons 1–2, replaced by Kevin K. Gomez)
The Barbie Diaries – Kevin
Cardcaptors – Kero (borrowed form)
Galaxy Angel A – Cat Bandit
Gundam Seed – Kira Yamato
Gundam Seed Special Edition – Kira Yamato
Gundam Seed Destiny – Kira Yamato
Gundam Seed Destiny Special Edition – Kira Yamato
.hack//Roots – Hideyo
Hakkenden – Gakuso
Hamtaro – Roberto
Hello Carbot — S-Line and Sonic Boom
Inuyasha – Bankotsu
Kingdom series – Mou Ten
Little Battlers Experience – Keita Morigami
Master Keaton – Dean
MegaMan NT Warrior – Bass.EXE, AquaMan.EXE
Mirmo! – Tako
Mobile Suit Gundam – Additional Voices
Monster Rancher – Mew
Please Save My Earth – Mikuro
Powerpuff Girls Z – Poochi
Ranma ½ – Pantyhose Taro (season 6–7)
Ronin Warriors/Yoroiden Samurai Troopers – Ryo Sanada (真田　リョウ)
Star Ocean EX TV Series – Claude C. Kenni
Tara Duncan – Caliban Dal Salan
Tayo the Little Bus – Rogi, Poco, Vroomy, Preschool Bus, and Additional Voices (English Version)
Transformers: Armada – Carlos
Transformers: Energon – Carlos, Ironhide
Tobot — Tobot Y

Animation

Imaginext: Fortress of the Dragon (2003)-Zack
2 Cool at the Pocket Plaza – Eric Wilder, Todd
A Kidnapping in the Family – Chris Landers
A Fairytale Christmas – Dash, Bandit #1
A Monkey's Tale – Kom
Alexis and Milton – Bully
Ardie the Aardvark – Irwin the Ant
Battery Mates – Danny
Bible Stories – Young Traveller
Billy the Cat – Dizzy
Cosmic Quantum Ray – Scott
Courage the Cowardly Dog – Teddy Bears
Crash of the Titans – Additional Voices
Dead Like Me – Icarus Jones
Def Jam: Fight for NY – Clean Cut
Dino Babies – Stanley
Dogboy – Narrator
Dragon Booster – Artha Penn, Dragon Booster
Dragon Tales – The Grudge
Fat Dog Mendoza – Additional Voices
Fatal Fury: The Motion Picture – Laocorn Gaudeamus, Duck King
February 15, 1839 – Soldat McDonald
Finley the Fire Engine – Miguel
Firehouse Tales – Ring a Ling
Fish Hooks – Animal Control Guy #1, Delivery Guy
Funky Fables – Various
G.I. Joe Extreme – Matthew 'Metal Head' Hurley
G.I. Joe: Spy Troops – Beach Head
Generation O! – Buzz O!
George of the Jungle – Additional Voices
GeoTrax – Eric
High School Lives – Billy
Home Movies – Fireman, Hotel Manager
Hurricanes – Indian Boy
Jetix – Voice
Johnnor in Japan – Johnnor Symmes
Journey to GloE - Bear
LeapFrog – Additional Voices
Lilo & Stitch: The Series – Kato Stewart
¡Mucha Lucha! – Timmy of a Thousand Masks
Madeline – Additional Voices
Madison – Billy
Make Way for Noddy – Whiz
Underground Ernie - Jubilee (US Dub)
Martha Speaks – Kazuo
Martin Mystery – Marvin
Melrose Place – Hank
Monster Rancher – Mew
Mr. Bean (animated series) – Additional Voices
Mummies Alive! – Additional Voices
My Little Pony: Friendship Is Magic – Soarin', Spear
NBA Street Vol. 2 – Various
Ninja Turtles: The Next Mutation – Raphael (voice)
Pac-Man and the Ghostly Adventures – Skeebo
Polly Pocket: Lunar Eclipse – Todd
Polly Pocket 2: Cool at the Pocket Plaza – Todd/Eric Wilder
PollyWorld – Todd/DJ (voice)
Rainbow Fish – Barry Cuda
Rudolph the Red-Nosed Reindeer: The Movie – Arrow/Donner (voice)
Sabrina's Secret Life – Additional Voices
Shadow Raiders – Prince Pyrus
Sitting Ducks – Additional Voices
Sleepwalkers – Andy
Slugterra – Mario Brevado
Special Unit 2 – Richie
Street Fighter – Gang Kid, Henchman
Street Sharks – Jab/Clint Bolton
Taken – Willie
The Bots Master – Watzon
The Adventures of the Black Stallion – Danny Booth
The Adventures of Corduroy – Corduroy
The Baby Huey Show – Bully
The Barbie Diaries – Kevin
The Condor – Skragg
The Little Prince – Sahara (Planet of the Amicopes)
The New Adventures of Peter Pan – Peter Pan
The Sentinel – Deputy Toliver
The Ten Commandments – Joshua
Titanic – Phillips
Trollz – Rock Trollhammer
War Planets – Prince Pyrus
Wendell, Son of Santa – Various
Wondrous Myths and Legends – Broden
X-Men: Evolution – Havok/Alex Masters
X-Play – The Teenies
Zigby – Bertie
Zoids Fuzors – Rattle, Bartender, Jean Holiday

Video games

Live-action roles

Film
Bordello of Blood – Reggie
Shanghai Knights – the Deputy
Teenage Mutant Ninja Turtles III – Raphael (suit actor)
Watchers – Boy on bike
See Grace Fly - School Security Guard

Television
Honey, I Shrunk the Kids: The TV Show – Kyle Spritzenegger
Jake 2.0 – Kevin (1 episode)
Neon Rider – Keith
Tales from the Crypt – Reggie
The X-Files – Private Dunham (Episode: "Fresh Bones")

References

External links

Official website
Run For One Planet Official Homepage
Official Facebook page

1968 births
Living people
Canadian male film actors
Canadian male television actors
Canadian male video game actors
Canadian male voice actors
Canadian motivational speakers
Canadian male marathon runners
Canadian expatriates in the United States